The Battle of Curupayty was a key battle in the Paraguayan War. On the morning on 22 September 1866, the joint force of Brazilian, Argentine, and Uruguayan armies attacked Paraguayan fortified trenches on Curupayty. The Paraguayans were led by general José Eduvigis Díaz. This position was held by 5,000 men and 49 cannons, some of them in hidden places out of the attackers view. The Imperial Brazilian Navy gave support to the 20,000 assailants, but the ships had to keep some distance from the guns at the fortress of Humaitá, which led to the lack of accuracy and impact of the ship's fire. The navy's failure was crucial at the later ground battle result.

The Paraguayans were also successful in misleading their foes: a trench drew most of the Brazilian fire, but the Paraguayan troops were located elsewhere. Around 20 percent of the almost 20,000 allied (Brazilian and Argentine) troops involved in the attack were lost; Paraguay lost less than a hundred men. The utter failure resulted in the change of the Allied command. Paraguay's biggest success in the ultimately disastrous war was limited because its military leader, Francisco Solano López, did not counterattack the defeated Allies.

Opposing Forces

Naval bombardment 
The 22 September attack started with a bombardment by admiral Joaquim Marques Lisboa's fleet at 07:00 which lasted until noon, but with little effect.  Participating in the attack were the ships Brasil, Barroso, Tamandaré, Ipiranga, Belmonte, Parnaíba, Pedro Affonso, Forte de Coimbra, and the gunboats No. 1, 2, and 3. Despite the firing of 5,000 bombs and shells, only one Paraguayan gun was damaged.

Allied land attack 

Bartolomé Mitre warned that the Imperial fleet had finished its cannonade and assuming that the Paraguayan positions were to be destroyed, he ordered the advance on land. The right wing was composed of two columns of Argentines, under the command of general Emilio Mitre and general Wenceslao Paunero. The left wing was composed of two columns of Brazilians under the command of general Albino de Carvalho and colonel Augusto Caldas. The center Brazilians were commanded by colonel Lucas de Lima.

General Polidoro Jordão was to attack the Paraguayan defenses at Paso Gomez, along the Estero Rojas, with 20,000 Brazilians. General Venancio Flores was to take a cavalry force in a flanking movement against the Paraguayan's on the Allied right. Once the Allied soldiers had crossed two ditches, and were reaching the top of the wall, they were within reach of the Paraguayan artillery; Díaz ordered the artillery to fire with grape, canister, and shell shot. This inflicted heavy casualties amongst the Allied troops who were slowly advancing in dense formations through the muddy terrain.  Allied soldiers could not get close to the wall of the Paraguayan fort, with only 60 making it, who were soon killed. By 14:00, the attack was abandoned, and by 17:00, the Allied army was back in Curuzú.

Aftermath
The Allied offensive was halted for ten months, until July 1867. Cholera outbreaks struck the area in March 1866 and September 1867. Open revolt against the war started in Argentina by January 1867, forcing President Mitre to send "The Army of Pacification" of 4,000 under Paunero's command.  Disturbances in Uruguay forced the recall of general Flores, who was subsequently assassinated.

Gallery: Timeline of the battle of Curupayty by Cándido Lopez

References 

 

Battles of the Paraguayan War
Battles involving Argentina
Battles involving Brazil
Battles involving Uruguay
September 1866 events
1866 in Paraguay
History of Ñeembucú Department